Writing with Fire is a 2021 Indian documentary film directed by filmmakers Sushmit Ghosh and Rintu Thomas about the journalists running the Dalit women led newspaper Khabar Lahariya, as they shift from 14-years of print to digital journalism using smartphones. It is the first Indian feature documentary to be nominated for an Academy Award for Best Documentary Feature.

Produced under Ghosh and Thomas' Black Ticket Films banner, the film had its world premiere at the 2021 Sundance Film Festival, where it won two awards, the Audience Award and a Special Jury Award in the World Cinema Documentary category. It received unanimous acclaim from film festivals and critics, winning several international awards and critical acclaim from the press. It was named a "Critics Pick" by The New York Times, and Jason Rezaian at The Washington Post called it "the most inspiring journalism movie — maybe ever".

Synopsis
Writing with Fire tells the story of Khabar Lahariya, the only news agency in India run by Dalit (oppressed-caste) women. Armed with smartphones, these women journalists report from some of the most difficult regions of the country, risking everything to speak truth to power. Led by Chief Reporter Meera and her feisty understudy, crime reporter Suneeta, the film bears witness to the wit, intelligence and compassion of these journalists in confronting the most urgent stories of our times.

Set in the backdrop of an increasingly polarized world, Writing with Fire journeys with Meera and her band of sisters for five years - as they break traditions on the frontlines of India's biggest issues and within the confines of their homes, redefining what it truly means to be powerful.

Reception

Critical reception
The film has garnered a 100% score on Rotten Tomatoes from critics based on 51 reviews, with an average rating of 8.40/10. The site's critical consensus reads, "Writing with Fire pays stirring tribute to the power of journalism -- and presents a chilling glimpse of the forces aligned against it." 

Jessica Kiang from Variety reviewed the film as a "rousing, inspirational tribute to the pride of grassroots Indian journalism". Inkoo Kang at The Hollywood Reporter called the film "insightful and inspirational". while Kate Erbland at IndieWire reviewed it "profound". The Los Angeles Times called the film "a vital, stimulating dispatch from the frontlines of consequential citizen journalism" while the San Francisco Chronicle, giving the film a 5-star review, said "even Woodward and Bernstein would be inspired by the women reporters of India's Writing with Fire".

Reception by Khabar Lahariya journalists
The film and its impact was received positively by Kavita Devi, the co-founder of Khabar Lahariya, and various team members who appeared with the film at film festivals and conferences with the filmmakers over 14 months since its world premiere at Sundance. Meera Devi, the main protagonist of Writing With Fire and Managing Editor of the news outlet, described the impact of the film as "From a global perspective, we have become a lot more popular since the film came out [in Sundance]. Both personally and professionally, it has really amplified the newspaper and its work. We have witnessed a completely different kind of popularity – and that is really good." Over a year later, once the film was nominated for an Academy Award, the organisation issued a statement criticising the film for presenting a simplified, incomplete profile of their work and "consuming focus of reporting on one party", which NPR identified as the Bharatiya Janata Party (BJP), India's national ruling party.  Srishti Mehra, outreach manager at Chambal Media, claimed that this "misrepresentation" could negatively affect the security and reputation of Khabar Lahariya and its journalists.

Accolades
Following its release, Writing with Fire was showcased at numerous film festivals and won several awards, including the World Cinema Documentary Special Jury Award: Impact for Change and the World Cinema Documentary Competition Audience Award at the 2021 Sundance Film Festival. In December 2021, it was announced that the film had entered the shortlist of candidates for the Academy Award for Best Documentary Feature in the 94th Academy Awards in 2022, and the next February it was announced that it had been nominated in this category.

References

External links
 
 

Indian documentary films
Documentary films about women in India
Documentary films about journalists
Documentary films about technology
Dalit culture
Indian women journalists
Women in Uttar Pradesh
Films shot in Uttar Pradesh
Documentary films about women writers